Jean de Coninck (1744–1807) was a Dutch-Danish merchant and ship-owner. In 1785, he joined his elder brother, Frédéric de Coninck, as partner in the Copenhagen-based trading house Coninck & Reiersen. He purchased the country house Marienborg in 1803 and was from 1806 a co-owner of the Royal Danish Silk Manufactury in Bredgade. He served as Russian consul in Copenhagen.

Biography
Jean de Coninck was born in the Netherlands, the son of Jean de C. (1692–1774) and Susanne Esther de Rapin de Thoyras (1710–1785).

His first wife, Theodora van Schellebeck (1755–1783), died just 23 years old in Holland. de Coninck moved to Copenhagen in 1784. On 7 January 1785, he was married to  Christiane Cathrine Reiersen (1755–1789), a younger sister of Niels Lunde Reiersen. In early February, he replaced Reiersen as partner of Coninck & Reiersen.

de Coninck's wife gave birth to daughter Anna Elisabeth in 1786 and son Jean Frederik in 1788. She died in labour with their third child in 1789.

In 1806, Coninck purchased the Royal Danish Silk Manufactury in Bredgade in a partnership with his brother, Charles August Selby and William Duntzfelt.  In 19+0. he purchased the country house Marienborg.

Family
He had the following children:
 Pierre de Coninck
 Sophie Marie de Connick
 Henriette Charlotte de Coninck
 Charles Auguste de Coninck
 Paul Emile de Coninck
  William de Coninck;
 Anne Elisabeth de Coninck
 Jean Frédéric de Coninck

References

External links
Jean de Coninck at geni.com

18th-century Danish businesspeople
18th-century Dutch businesspeople
19th-century Danish businesspeople
Dutch emigrants to Denmark
1744 births
1807 deaths